Lucin (also known as Umbria Junction) is a small railroad community in Box Elder County, Utah, United States, located along the western side of the Great Salt Lake,  northwest of Salt Lake City. Abandoned in the 1930s by original occupants, the community was resettled by four owner-residents in the 1990s.

History 

The town was moved in 1903 to serve as a stop for the Lucin Cutoff. Historically, the town's population consisted mainly of employees of the Central and Southern Pacific Railroads. In 1936 the town was abandoned, and then resettled by a group of retired railroad workers and their children.

For a while, no one had lived in Lucin, until 1997 when Ivo Zdarsky, venturing aviation entrepreneur and manufacturer of the Ivoprop, a plane propeller, bought it and moved there.

The area is managed for migrating songbirds and other wildlife by the Utah Division of Wildlife Resources.

The town was named for a local fossil bivalve, the Lucina subanta.

Lucin today 
Except for the intermittent (more permanent since 2008) presence of Ivo, one of the four property owners and avid solitary explorer, and his IVOPROP Corp research and development activities, Lucin is a ghost town. As of 2016, the most prominent town features are a recent airplane hangar doubling as a residence and a workshop, an adjacent unpaved landing strip, along with several smaller, separate utility buildings (water, fuel, telecommunications, power).

Ivo, a former engineering student in Prague, made headlines in 1984 as an Eastern Bloc defector, when aged 24 he managed to escape the Iron Curtain by flying then silently gliding over the back-then heavily guarded Czechoslovak-Austrian border. He flew under night cover, avoiding radars, with a custom-built glider powered with a 600cc Trabant engine and propellers of his own design, and landed still undetected at Vienna International Airport. Originally re-settling in California, Ivo eventually sold his DIY plane to the Berlin Checkpoint Charlie Museum's unique collection of escape vehicles. Lucin offers a practical test-ground, and hosts Ivo's newest flying inventions and other designs.

A description of what remains from the old town includes a pond fed by a pipe that brings water from the nearby Pilot Range, a group of trees in an otherwise barren desert, and various everyday items left by the former residents. There are no remaining buildings, but there are root cellars and two concrete phone booths.

The original grading of the railroad can be found heading northeast toward Promontory, Utah and the Golden Spike National Historic Site.

The Lucin area is a popular stop for rockhounds looking for an apple- green chert-like phosphate mineral variscite, also known as utahlite and lucinite.

Nearby is a large artwork called the Sun Tunnels, which was created by artist Nancy Holt in 1976.

Climate
According to the Köppen Climate Classification system, Lucin has a semi-arid climate, abbreviated "BSk" on climate maps.

See also

 List of ghost towns in Utah

References

External links

 Recording of a Solstice Observation at the Sun Tunnels

Ghost towns in Box Elder County, Utah
Populated places established in 1903
1903 establishments in Utah
Ghost towns in Utah